Beneath the Surface is a children's picture book by the author Gary Crew and illustrated by Steven Woolman. It is a sequel to The Watertower. It was published in 2004, 10 years after its predecessor.

It is about Dr Spiro Trotter, aka Spike from The Watertower, who is a hydrologist. He returns to Preston, twenty years from the events of the last novel, to test the water in the mysterious watertower on the hill. The words in the book describe Spike's actions, while the pictures on each page skip all around the world.

References

2004 children's books
Australian picture books
Children's fiction books
Australian children's books
Aurealis Award-winning works
Books by Gary Crew